Ieperfest is a Belgian hardcore music festival held in Ypres. The summer edition of the festival was first held in September 1992, then annually each August from 1994 to 2018 (no summer event was held in 1993). Since 2019, the summer edition has been held annually each July. In February 2008, a winter edition was introduced, which was held annually in either February or March, until 2015 (no winter event was held in 2009). The winter edition has since been held sporadically, namely in 2018 and 2022. In 2012, during its 20th anniversary, Ieperfest became the longest-running hardcore festival in the world.

From 1992 to 1998, the festival was held inside De Vort'n Vis concert venue in Ypres; but starting with the 1999 edition, outdoor locations have been used to accommodate a growing audience. The 1999 and 2000 editions were held in the open courtyard of the Stedelijke Academie voor Muziek en Woord music school. From 2001 to 2007, the festival was held at the Jeugdstadion Camping Site parking lot (with the exception of 2002 when it was held on the grounds of the CID Lines company). In 2008, Ieperfest moved to its current open air location on Poperingseweg.

The festival was first organized by Edward Verhaeghe, owner of the record label Warehouse Records (now Good Life Recordings), in September 1992. Verhaeghe has had little involvement in the booking of the festival following its first year. Hans Verbeke, owner of Sober Mind Records and an employee at De Vort'n Vis, took over for the 1994 and 1995 editions, until Bruno Vandevyvere, owner of Genet Records and Pyrrhus Records and an owner of De Vort'n Vis, became the main organizer in 1996; a position he continues to hold.

Though Ieperfest has historically focused on metalcore bands, a wide variety of hardcore and metal groups have also performed throughout its span, including emotional hardcore, post-hardcore, punk rock, grindcore, death metal, thrash metal, sludge metal, doom metal and stoner rock. The festival has been singled out as influential to Michal Kočan, who cited it as his motivator to start his own Czech music festival, Fluff Fest.

History 

Ieperfest was first conceived in 1992 by Belgian vocalist Edward Verhaeghe, a hardcore musician who had played in such bands as The Midnight Men, Rise Above and Nations on Fire, and was then operating the record label Warehouse Records. Verhaeghe would later establish the noted Belgian hardcore record label Good Life Recordings.

Although Verhaeghe resided in Kortrijk, Belgium, he booked his new festival at De Vort'n Vis, a popular concert venue for hardcore bands located 30 minutes away in Ypres, Belgium. The festival was not booked again in 1993.

In 1994, another noted Kortrijk, Belgium-based musician, Hans Verbeke, took over the booking of the festival. Verbeke worked at De Vort'n Vis, and had played in such bands as Rise Above, Shortsight, Blindfold, Spirit of Youth, Wheel of Progress (and later Liar) and was also operating the hardcore record label Sober Mind Records. Verbeke also booked the 1995 edition.

In 1996, the festival was taken over by Ghent, Belgium-based Bruno Vandevyvere, owner of the record label Genet Records and the record store Pyrrhus Records. Vandevyvere was one of the founders of De Vort'n Vis and had therefore been involved in the first three editions' bookings to some extent. In 1999, Genet Records released the compact disc Various Artists compilation Vort'n Vis Hardcore Festival 1998, which documented most of the bands that had performed at the 1998 edition of the festival.

By 1999, the festival had outgrown the audience capacity of De Vort'n Vis, and for the next two years, it was held in the courtyard of Stedelijke Academie voor Muziek en Woord. In December 2000, Good Life Recordings released the VHS Good Life Recordings Presents: Good Life T.V. Video Sampler #1, which includes live footage of bands performing at the 1999 and 2000 editions of the festival.

In 2001, the festival was moved to the parking lot of the Jeugdstadion campsite, where previous years' attendees setup living accommodations. In 2002, the parking lot was unavailable due to a mountainbicycle event, so local business CID Lines offered their land to host the festival.

In February 2008, a one-day winter edition of the festival was introduced, which was held annually in February or March until 2015 (no winter event was held in 2009). A winter edition was originally planned for February 21, 2009, but was cancelled when the bookers were unable to find headlining acts. The winter edition has since been held sporadically, namely in 2018 and 2022.

In August 2008, Ieperfest moved to a new location, where it continues to be held each year, on a farmland at Poperingseweg 153–161. That year also introduced two stages for bands to perform.

Ieperfest lineups by year

September 5–6, 1992: Hardcore '92 Festival 
Location: De Vort'n Vis, Kiekenmarkt 7, 8900, Ypres, Belgium.

Saturday, September 5 

 Blindfold
 Feeding the Fire
 Ironside (headliners)
 No More
 Shortsight
 Spirit of Youth
 Strong Event

Sunday, September 6 

 Abolition
 Nations on Fire (headliners)
 Strengthen the Will

August 19–21, 1994: Hardcore Festival '94 
Location: De Vort'n Vis, Kiekenmarkt 7, 8900, Ypres, Belgium.

Friday, August 19 

 Congress
 Kosjer D
 Spawn (headliners)

Saturday, August 20 

 Abhinanda
 Acme
 Backdraft
 Blindfold
 Fabric (headliners)
 Nothing Left to Grasp
 Refused
 Shortsight

Sunday, August 21 

 Feeding the Fire
 Iconoclast (headliners)
 Hopeman Path
 Neckbrace
 Undone

Notes: The following bands were also booked but did not play: Nations on Fire, Neuthrone, Scraps, Strength of the Will, State of Grace, Stormwatch and Voorhees.

August 18–20, 1995: Hardcore-Festival '95 
Location: De Vort'n Vis, Kiekenmarkt 7, 8900, Ypres, Belgium.

Friday, August 18 

 Burning Defeat (headliners)
 Solid
 The Jedi

Saturday, August 19 

 Abhinanda (headliners)
 Blindfold
 Comrades
 Concrete
 Congress
 Doughnuts
 Kosjer D
 Mainstrike
 Rancor
 Veil

Sunday, August 20 

 By All Means
 Chokehold (headliners)
 Churn
 End in Sight
 Fungus
 Liar
 Timebomb

Notes: The following bands were also booked but did not play: Regression and Steadfast.

August 16–18, 1996: Hardcore, The Next Generation 
Location: De Vort'n Vis, Kiekenmarkt 7, 8900, Ypres, Belgium.

Friday, August 16 

 Down for the Count
 Facedown
 Firestone
 Liar
 Outrage
 Spawn
 Unborn (headliners)
 Victims of Society
 Vitality

Saturday, August 17 

 Burning Defeat
 Congress
 Despair (headliners)
 Kindred
 Racial Abuse
 Regression
 Said I Was
 Sektor
 Timebomb
 Voices at the Front

Sunday, August 18 

 Approach to Concrete
 Bruma
 Resist the Pain
 Separation
 Spineless
 Stampin' Ground
 Swing Kids (headliners)
 Vanilla
 With Love

Notes: The following bands were also booked but did not play: Azure, Blindfold, Contention and Refused.

August 15–17, 1997: Hardcore: The Next Generation 
Location: De Vort'n Vis, Kiekenmarkt 7, 8900, Ypres, Belgium.

Friday, August 15 

 Abhinanda
 Clouded
 Endstand
 Facedown
 Instinct
 Purification
 Reiziger
 Spineless
 Veil (headliners)

Saturday, August 16 

 Blindfold
 Culture (headliners)
 Intensity
 Kindred
 Liar
 Metroshifter
 ODK-Crew
 Sektor
 Serene
 Spirit of Youth
 Thumbsdown

Sunday, August 17 

 Acheborn
 Congress
 Deformity
 Lifecycle
 Mainstrike
 Morning Again (headliners)
 Rubbish Heap
 Starmarket
 Vitality

August 14–16, 1998: Hardcore: The Next Generation Festival 
Location: De Vort'n Vis, Kiekenmarkt 7, 8900, Ypres, Belgium.

Friday, August 14 

 Building
 Contrition
 Culture (headliners)
 Driven
 Liar
 One Fine Day
 One More
 Stack
 Timebomb

Saturday, August 15 

 Clouded
 Earthmover (headliners)
 Facedown
 Highscore
 Opposite Force
 Pray Silent
 Sad Origin
 Seein' Red
 Spineless
 Thumbsdown

Sunday, August 16 

 Arkangel
 Ashlar
 Caliban
 Congress (headliners)
 D.S.A.
 Eyeball
 Firestone
 Inflexible
 Lifecycle
 Reply
 Reiziger

Notes: Most of the bands that played were documented on the Genet Records Various Artists compilation Vort'n Vis Hardcore Festival 1998, released on compact disc in 1999.

August 20–22, 1999: Ieper Hardcore Festival 

Location: Stedelijke Academie voor Muziek en Woord, D'hondtstraat 59, 8900, Ypres, Belgium.

Friday, August 20 

 100 Years Of Forgetting
 As Friends Rust (headliners)
 Discount
 Heaven Shall Burn
 Hebriana
 Hot Water Music
 JR Ewing
 Once...Never Again
 Mainstrike
 Sad Origin
 Surface
 Tumult

Saturday, August 21 

 Ananda
 Bloodpact
 Ensign (headliners)
 H-Street
 Ochtenddauw
 Pray Silent
 Product
 Redemption
 Reveal
 Sabeth
 Spineless
 Stroke of Grace
 Thumbs Down

Sunday, August 22 

 Facedown
 Instinct
 Jane
 John Holmes
 Leiah
 Point of View
 Reaching Forward
 Sunrise
 The Get Up Kids (headliners)
 True Blue
 Vitality

Notes: Good Life Recordings released the VHS Good Life Recordings Presents: Good Life T.V. Video Sampler #1 in December 2000 which includes live footage of bands performing at the 1999 and 2000 editions of the festival.

August 18–20, 2000: Vort'n Vis Hardcore Festival 2000 
Location: Stedelijke Academie voor Muziek en Woord, D'hondtstraat 59, 8900, Ypres, Belgium.

Thursday, August 17 

 Killed in Action
 Retalliate
 Search of Fury
 Striker

Notes: This was a free pre-festival concert held at De Vort'n Vis.

Friday, August 18 

 Amenra
 Ariel Kill Him
 Building
 Cast in Fire
 Cataract
 Ensign (headliners)
 January Star
 Lumen
 Reiziger
 Serene
 Voorhees
 With Love

Saturday, August 19 

 5 Day Get Away
 Born from Pain
 Circle
 Dawncore
 Evanesce
 Firestone
 Good Clean Fun
 Grade (headliners)
 Knut
 Leiah
 Negate
 Point of No Return
 Possession
 Sad Origin

Sunday, August 20 

 As Friends Rust (headliners)
 Bobby Peru
 Children of Fall
 Course of Action
 Inane
 Length of Time
 Oil
 One Fine Day
 Purification
 Reveal
 Severance
 Standing Tall
 Stigmata

Notes: The following bands were also booked but did not play: Chispa, Convinced, Garrison, Out for Blood, Piebald, Shai Hulud and Walls of Jericho. As Friends Rust's set was cut short after only three songs. Good Life Recordings released the VHS Good Life Recordings Presents: Good Life T.V. Video Sampler #1 in December 2000 which includes live footage of bands performing at the 1999 and 2000 editions of the festival.

August 17–19, 2001: 2001: A Hardcore Odyssey 
Location: Jeugdstadion Camping Site Parking Lot, Leopold III - Laan 16, Ypres, Belgium.

Thursday, August 16 

 DJ Schelpe

Notes: This was a free pre-festival party held at De Vort'n Vis.

Friday, August 17 

 Caliban
 Children of Fall
 Course of Action
 Deadbolt
 The Deal
 E-150
 Endstand
 From the Dying Sky
 Good Clean Fun (headliners)
 Retaliate
 Severance
 Unconquered

Saturday, August 18 

 Catharsis
 Circle
 Comrades
 Juliette
 Liar
 Man VS Humanity
 New End Original
 Possession
 Reproach
 Stack
 The Locust (headliners)
 The Oath
 Venerea

Sunday, August 19 

 Burden
 Concrete
 Die...My Demon
 Facedown
 Kingpin
 Leiah
 Manifesto Jukebox
 Maximum Penalty (headliners)
 Newborn
 PN
 Reliance

Notes: After-parties were held on Friday, Saturday and Sunday nights at De Vort'n Vis with DJ Jaak. Reveal was booked to play but did not.

August 16–18, 2002: Ieperfest 2002 
Location: CID Lines Festival Ground, Waterpoortstraat 2, 8900, Ypres, Belgium.

Thursday, August 15

De Vort'n Vis 

 Kombat
 Retaliate (headliners)
 Straight to the Bar
 Zero Tolerance

Notes: This was a free pre-festival concert held at De Vort'n Vis.

Jeugdstadion 

 Amenra
 S.F.P.
 The Diamond Sea (headliners)
 The Eliot Ness
 The Hors D'Oeuvres
 Wilson

Notes: This was a free pre-festival concert held at the Jeugdstadion campground.

Friday, August 16 

 Absence
 Born from Pain
 Chimaera
 Congress (headliners)
 Die...My Demon
 I Adapt
 JR Ewing
 Max Rebo Kids
 Morda
 Newborn
 Pretty Girls Make Graves
 Smut Peddlers
 Reply
 Risen

Saturday, August 17 

 Burn Hollywood Burn
 Cast-Down
 Darkest Hour
 Dead Stop
 Degradation
 Heaven Shall Burn (headliners)
 Length of Time
 Nothing Gold Can Stay
 Severance
 Square One
 Strike Anywhere
 Sunrise
 The Deal
 Trial by Fire

Sunday, August 18 

 Absone
 Amulet
 As Friends Rust (headliners)
 Between the Lines
 Circle
 Deformity
 Fear My Thoughts
 Flatcat
 Let it Burn
 Point of No Return
 Pointing Finger
 Sworn In
 The Zaccharia

Notes: After-parties were held on Friday, Saturday and Sunday nights at De Vort'n Vis with DJ Jaak.

August 15–17, 2003: Ieper Hardcore Festival 
Location: Jeugdstadion Camping Site Parking Lot, Leopold III - Laan 16, Ypres, Belgium.

Thursday, August 14 

 1 Outta 6
 Die...My Demon
 Forced Hate
 I Adapt
 Strength Approach

Notes: This was a free pre-festival concert held at the Jeugdstadion campground.

Friday, August 15 

 .Calibre (headliners)
 Career Suicide
 Death Before Disco
 Es La Guerilla
 I Shot Cyrus
 Liar
 Miracle of 86
 Nothing Gold Can Stay
 One Fine Cast
 Pointing Finger
 Severance
 Solid
 The Horror
 White Circle Crime Club

Saturday, August 16 

 Agathocles
 All Out War (headliners)
 Cataract
 Discarga
 Empathy
 Fear of God
 Himsa
 Integrity
 Morda
 Narziss
 No Denial
 Nueva Ética
 Senseless
 The Miles Apart

Sunday, August 17 

 Afterlife
 Born from Pain
 Caliban (headliners)
 Confronto
 Cornflames
 Dead Stop
 Engrave
 Face Tomorrow
 Kingpin
 Length of Time
 Strychnine
 The Set Up
 Vuur

Notes: The following bands were also booked but did not play: Last Days of April, The Furious and The Locust.

August 27–29, 2004: Ieper Hardcore Fest 2004 
Location: Jeugdstadion Camping Site Parking Lot, Leopold III - Laan 16, Ypres, Belgium.

Thursday, August 26 

 37 Stabwoundz
 Minus 45 Degrees
 One Fine Cast (headliners)
 Self Reflection

Notes: This was a free pre-festival concert held at the Jeugdstadion campground.

Friday, August 27 

 Bathtub Shitter
 Between the Lines
 Bridge to Solace
 Children of Gaia
 Dead Stop (headliners)
 Horse the Band
 Integrity
 Last Hope
 No Turning Back
 Ratos de Porão
 Shredder
 Some Girls
 The Oath
 Vitamin X
 With Love

Saturday, August 28 

 25 ta Life
 Amenra
 Caliban (headliners)
 Chimaera
 Colligere
 Die...My Demon
 In Arm's Reach
 Mental
 Mörser
 Nine
 Purification
 Retaliate
 Satanic Surfers
 Vanilla
 Year Future

Sunday, August 29 

 Ariel Kill Him
 Congress
 Destiny
 Fabulous Disaster
 Facedowninshit
 Hitch
 Morda
 Most Precious Blood (headliners)
 Nothing Gold Can Stay
 One Outta Six
 Pretty Girls Make Graves
 Rise and Fall
 Seven Feet Four
 Switchblade
Notes: The following bands were also booked but did not play: Death by Stereo, Disfear, Over My Dead Body and Rag Men.

August 26–28, 2005: Ieper Hardcore Fest 
Location: Jeugdstadion Camping Site Parking Lot, Leopold III - Laan 16, Ypres, Belgium.

Friday, August 26 

 Another Breath
 Born from Pain
 Children of Fall
 Confronto
 Leng Tch'e
 Liar
 Maudlin
 Misery Index (headliners)
 Requiem
 The Death of Anna Karina
 The Maple Room
 The Setup
 The Spectacle
 Values Intact
 Verse

Saturday, August 27 

 Amanda Woodward
 Amenra
 Beecher
 Born/Dead
 Core of Anger
 Darkest Hour (headliners)
 Deadlock
 Deadsoil
 Do or Die
 Ikaros
 Minus45Degrees
 Reflux
 Rejuvenate
 Starkweather
 The Je Ne Sais Quoi
 Trust

Sunday, August 28 

 Aborted
 Awoken
 Chimaera
 Das Oath (headliners)
 Die...My Demon
 For the Glory
 Fucked Up
 Hoods
 Justice
 Knuckledust
 Mental
 Officer Jones and His Patrol Car Problems
 Panthers
 Seein' Red
 The Rites

Notes: The following bands were also booked but did not play: Donnybrook, Kill Your Idols, Full Circle Broken, Morning Again and Neshamah. Morning Again was supposed to perform a headlining reunion show on August 27, 2005, but cancelled their trip to Europe.

August 25–27, 2006: Ieper Hardcore Festival 
Location: Jeugdstadion Camping Site Parking Lot, Leopold III - Laan 16, Ypres, Belgium.

Friday, August 25 

 Amenra
 Angel Crew
 Caliban (headliners)
 Congress
 Neaera
 New Mexican Disaster Squad
 Paint It Black
 Psalm
 Rafflesia
 Restless Youth
 Strike First
 Switchblade
 Taint
 Textures
 The Chariot
 True Colors

Saturday, August 26 

 100 Demons
 Black Friday 29
 Blood Redemption
 JR Ewing
 Liar
 MDC
 Officer Jones and His Patrol Car Problems
 PN
 Rumble in Rhodos
 Settle the Score
 Sunpower
 Sworn Enemy (headliners)
 The Boss
 The Ocean
 The Sedan Vault
 Zero Mentality

Sunday, August 27 

 Ashema
 Clobberin Time
 Die!
 First Alliance
 Maroon (headliners)
 Minus45Degrees
 Parkway Drive
 Remembering Never
 Reproach
 Rise and Fall
 Shai Hulud
 Six Foot Ditch
 Skinless
 Strength Approach
Notes: The following bands were also booked but did not play: A Perfect Murder, Alove for Enemies, Cephalic Carnage, Circle One, Death Before Disco, Inked in Blood, Killing Time, Lords, Monochrome, Nodes of Ranvier, Subzero and Trapdoor Fucking Exit.

August 24–26, 2007: Ieper Hardcore Fest 
Location: Jeugdstadion Camping Site Parking Lot, Leopold III - Laan 16, Ypres, Belgium.

Thursday, August 23 

 All My Sins
 Collapsed
 Demon Squad (headliners)
 Mans Ruin
 The Boss

Notes: This was a free pre-festival concert held at the J.O.C. in Ieper.

Friday, August 24 

 As We Fight
 B.U.S.H.
 Deadsoil
 Eye of Judgment
 Fear My Thoughts
 Losing Streak
 Madball (headliners)
 No Recess
 No Trigger
 No Turning Back
 Rise and Fall
 Set Your Goals
 Six Foot Ditch
 The Setup
 True Colors
 World Collapse

Saturday, August 25 

 Aborted
 Black Haven
 Blacklisted
 Blood Redemption
 Cold as Life
 Fall of Serenity
 H8INC
 Human Demise
 Justice
 Knuckledust
 Murphy's Law
 Nothing Done
 Rafflesia
 The Black Dahlia Murder (headliners)
 The Ocean
 Victims

Sunday, August 26 

 Bane (headliners)
 Born from Pain
 Cataract
 Ceremony
 Deadlock
 Dying Fetus
 Fatal Recoil
 Have Heart
 Kaospilot
 Red Dons
 Shredder
 The Maple Room
 To Kill
 The Revisions

Notes: The following bands were also booked but did not play: Age of Ruin, Cephalic Carnage, Cult of Luna, Maroon, Lost Patrol Band, Nueva Ética Ruiner, Showbread and Wisdom in Chains.

February 9, 2008: Ieper Hardcore Fest Winter Edition 
Location: Zaal Fenix, Leopold III - Laan 16, Ypres, Belgium.

Saturday, February 9 

 Blessed by a Broken Heart
 Blood Stands Still
 For the Glory
 Furious Styles
 Municipal Waste (headliners)
 Psalm
 Rhythm to the Madness
 Shattered Realm
 The Setup
 Toxic Holocaust
 Trenchfoot
 Your Demise

August 22–24, 2008, Ieper Hardcore Festival 2008 
Location: Poperingseweg 153–161, 8908, Ypres, Belgium.

Thursday, August 21 

 Crossed the Line
 Link
 Omerta (headliners)
 Saviour
 The Brave Do Not Fear the Grave

Notes: This was a free pre-festival concert held on the Marquee Stage at Ieperfest.

Friday, August 22

Main Stage 

 All Shall Perish
 As Friends Rust
 Backfire!
 Blood Spencer
 Bridge to Solace
 Counting the Days
 Do or Die
 Lionheart
 Pulling Teeth
 Skarhead
 Sworn Enemy (headliners)
 Wisdom in Chains

Marquee Stage 

 After All
 Cancer Bats
 Danny Diablo
 Die...My Demon
 Fallen
 Fucked Up (headliners)
 Kingdom
 Maudlin
 Ruiner
 The Berzerker
 The Bones

Saturday, August 23

Main Stage 

 All My Sins
 Betrayed
 Bloodclot
 Common Cause
 Heartbreak Kid
 Homer
 Length of Time
 Maintain
 Nothing Gold Can Stay
 Parkway Drive (headliners)
 Pushed Too Far

Marquee Stage 

 Active Minds
 Amenra (headliners)
 Discarga
 Jerusalem the Black
 John Joseph
 Mans Ruin
 Mörser
 See You Next Tuesday
 Trigger the Bloodshed
 Zann

Sunday, August 24

Main Stage 

 Folsom
 H2O
 Have Heart
 Rhythm to the Madness
 Rise and Fall
 Shipwreck
 Sunpower
 Surge of Fury
 The Locust (headliners)
 Verse
 Vogue

Marquee Stage 

 A Wilhelm Scream (headliners)
 Cephalic Carnage
 Despised Icon
 Do Androids Dream of Electric Sheep?
 Endzweck
 Hello Bastards
 Fear My Thoughts
 Psalm
 Trentchfoot
 Vicious Circle

Notes: The following bands were also booked but did not play: Balzac, Hour of the Wolf, Outbreak, Pound for Pound, Red Tape Parade, Ringworm, Rotten Sound, Shook Ones, Sinking Ships, Soul Control, Sparkle of Hope, SS Decontrol and Warbringer.

August 28–30, 2009: Ieper Hardcore Festival 2009 
Location: Poperingseweg 153–161, 8908, Ypres, Belgium.

Thursday, August 27 

 Fundamental (headliners)
 Golden Bullet
 Open Sesame
 Sensual Noise
 The Ignored

Notes: This was a free pre-festival concert held on the Marquee Stage at Ieperfest.

Friday, August 28

Main Stage 

 Alcatraz
 Bane
 Down to Nothing
 First Blood
 Keith Caputo
 Kingdom
 Outrage
 Rhinoceros
 Teenage Lust
 Terror (headliners)
 Wait in Vain

Marquee Stage 

 Architects (headliners)
 Bandanos
 Crimson Falls
 Die Young
 Misery Signals
 Spoil Engine
 Stigma
 The Number Twelve Looks Like You
 True Colors
 Your Demise

Saturday, August 29

Main Stage 

 108
 Balance
 Blood Redemption
 Darkest Hour (headliners)
 Deal with It
 Hoods
 Knuckledust
 Lewd Acts
 Oatbreaker
 The Boss
 The Effort

Marquee Stage 

 Gold Kids
 Julith Krishun
 Liar
 Nasty
 ON
 Raein
 Rise and Fall (headliners)
 Skare Tactic
 Soul Control
 Suckinim Baenaim
 Trash Talk

Sunday, August 30

Main Stage 

 Black Haven
 Bold (headliners)
 Bringin' It Down
 Days of Betrayal
 Disembodied
 Morda
 Polar Bear Club
 Ritual
 Set Your Goals
 The Setup

Marquee Stage 

 A Wilhelm Scream (headliners)
 Aborted
 Annotations of an Autopsy
 Burning Skies
 Chuck Ragan
 Diablo Boulevard
 Nueva Ética
 Reagan Youth
 Trigger the Bloodshed
 Viatrophy

Notes: The following bands were also booked but did not play: An Emerald City, As We Fight, Blood Stands Still, For the Fallen Dreams, Impending Doom, Joe Coffee, Lower Class Brats, Misery Index, Psyopus, Rafflesia and Thick as Blood.

February 6, 2010: Ieper Hardcore Fest 2010 Winter Edition 
Location: Zaal Fenix, Leopold III - Laan 16, Ypres, Belgium.

Saturday, February 6 

 A Plea for Purging
 Arsonists Get All the Girls
 Brutality Will Prevail
 For the Glory
 Headshot
 Link
 Rafflesia
 Rise and Fall (headliners)
 Salt the Wound
 Trapped Under Ice
 Victims
 War from a Harlots Mouth

August 13–15, 2010: Ieper Hardcore Fest 
Location: Poperingseweg 153–161, 8908, Ypres, Belgium.

Friday, August 13, Saturday, August 14 and Sunday, August 15

Main Stage and Marquee Stage 

 50 Lions
 7 Seconds
 Agnostic Front (headliners)
 Alarma Man
 All Out War
 Amenra
 An Emerald City
 Annotations of an Autopsy
 Antagonist A.D.
 As We Fight
 Atlas Losing Grip
 Aussitot Mort
 Barn Burner
 Bitter End
 Bleed from Within
 Bleed Into One
 Bloody Phoenix
 Born from Pain
 Born to Lose
 Breakdown
 Brutality Will Prevail
 Carpathian
 Cataract
 Cerebral Ballzy
 Cold Existence
 Confronto
 Converge (headliners)
 Crossed the Line
 Cruel Hand
 Despised Icon
 Dying Fetus
 For the Glory
 Forensics
 Gaza
 Gravemaker
 Hang the Bastard
 In Blood We Trust
 Kingdom
 Knut
 Kvelertak
 Kylsea
 Madball (headliners)
 Miles Away
 Next Step Up
 New Morality
 No Turning Back
 Origin
 Paura
 Purification
 Rafflesia
 Raised Fist
 Reproach
 Ruiner
 SSS
 Strength Approach
 Strength for a Reason
 The Black Dahlia Murder
 The Black Heart Rebellion
 The End of All Reason
 This Is a Standoff
 Trash Talk
 Ufomammut
 Vitamin X
 Voivod

Notes: An accurate schedule of the performance dates and stages has not been located in archival material, therefore all of the bands from the summer 2010 edition are currently listed together. Should a schedule be found, the sections will be updated. The following bands were also booked but did not play: Campus, City of Ships, Dead Swans, Lewd Acts, Maximum Penalty, Rat City Riot, Slapshot, The Carrier, The Now Denial and The Freeze.

February 26, 2011: Ieper Hardcore Fest Winter Edition 
Location: Zaal Fenix, Leopold III - Laan 16, Ypres, Belgium.

Saturday, February 26 

 Anti-Icon
 Armagathas
 Carpathian
 Crimson Falls
 Defeater (headliners)
 Hive Destruction
 Knuckledust
 Last Hope
 Length of Time
 Musth
 Shaped by Fate
 The Setup

Notes: The following bands were also booked but did not play: Let Me Run, Möse, Soul Control and The Gohards.

August 12–14, 2011: Ieper Hardcore Fest 2011 
Location: Poperingseweg 153–161, 8908, Ypres, Belgium.

Thursday, August 11 

 Get Wise
 Grizzlyncher
 Hessian (headliners)
 One Step Beyond

Notes: This was a charged pre-festival concert held at the JOC 't Perron.

Friday, August 12

Main Stage 

 Anchor
 CDC
 Comeback Kid (headliners)
 Crawlspace
 Death Is Not Glamorous
 Headshot
 Ritual
 Sheer Terror
 Six Foot Ditch
 Soul Control
 Strife

Marquee Stage 

 And So I Watch You from Afar (headliners)
 Black Kites
 Cheap Girls
 Ghostlimb
 Horse the Band
 La Dispute
 Lemuria
 The Ignored
 The Stupids
 Touché Amoré
 Victims

Saturday, August 13

Main Stage 

 Against Your Society
 All Teeth
 Angel Crew
 Exodus
 First Blood
 Golden Bullet
 Meshuggah (headliners)
 Stick to Your Guns
 Strike Anywhere
 Sworn Enemy
 The Carrier

Marquee Stage 

 Agathocles
 City of Ships
 Drop Dead (headliners)
 Jonah Matranga
 Mondo Gecko
 Oathbreaker
 Polikarpa Y Sus Viciosas
 Red Tape Parade
 Reiziger
 Shadows Chasing Ghosts
 Xibalba

Sunday, August 14

Main Stage 

 Betrayal
 Black Haven
 Blood for Blood
 Bury Your Dead
 Death Before Dishonor
 Fatal Recoil
 For the Fallen Dreams
 Ignite
 Kvelertak
 The Dillinger Escape Plan (headliners)

Marquee Stage 

 A Wilhelm Scream
 Decapitated (headliners)
 Drums Are for Parades
 EF
 Exhumed
 Musth
 Swashbuckle
 The Mahones
 The Secret
 Tombs

Notes: The following bands were also booked but did not play: Broken Teeth, Cro-Mags, Decortica, Harm's Way, Merauder, Pound for Pound, SFA, Wisdom in Chains and Withdrawal.

February 18, 2012: Ieper Hardcore Fest Winter Edition 
Location: JOC 't Perron, Fochlaan 1, 8900, Ypres, Belgium.

Saturday, February 18 

 Deafheaven
 Doom
 Hierophant
 Integrity
 Kingdom
 No Turning Back
 Rot in Hell
 Vanna
 Vicious
 Wrong Answer

Notes: The following bands were also booked but did not play: Goodtime Boys and Pianos Become the Teeth.

August 10–12, 2012: Ieper Hardcore Fest 
Location: Poperingseweg 153–161, 8908, Ypres, Belgium.

Thursday, August 9 

 6 Days of Justice
 Countdown
 DRS (headliners)
 The Gohards

Notes: This was a charged pre-festival concert held at the Marquee Stage at Ieperfer.

Friday, August 10

Main Stage 

 Agnostic Front (headliners)
 Corrosion of Conformity
 Crown of Thornz
 Death by Stereo
 Funeral for a Friend
 Knuckledust
 Kylesa
 Midnight Souls
 Norma Jean
 Take Offense
 The Mongoloids

Marquee Stage 

 Aborted
 Coke Bust
 Congress (headliners)
 Dukatalon
 For the Glory
 Homer
 Mucky Pup
 Skarhead
 The Chariot

Saturday, August 11

Main Stage 

 Cornered
 Ignite
 Reign Supreme
 Sick of It All (headliners)
 Still Strong
 The Black Dahlia Murder
 Trapped Under Ice
 TRC
 Truth and Its Burden
 Unearth
 Your Demise

Marquee Stage 

 Eyehategod
 Grand Magus
 Hellbastard
 MxPx Allstars
 Nasum
 No Second Thought
 Pianos Become the Teeth
 Pig Destroyer (headliners)
 Scraps
 Vaccine
 Whatever It Takes

Sunday, August 12

Main Stage 

 7 Seconds
 Bolt Thrower (headliners)
 Brutality Will Prevail
 Converge
 Crowbar
 Cruel Hands
 Deez Nuts
 Naysayer
 Terror
 The Cold Harbour

Marquee Stage 

 A Strength Within
 Cattle Decapitation
 Darkest Hour (headliners)
 Deformity
 Incantation
 Nemea
 Rise and Fall
 Set Your Goals
 The Death of Anna Karina
 Toxic Holocaust

Notes: The following bands were also booked but did not play: Balance and Composure, Dean Dirg, D.O.A., Here Comes the Kraken, Man VS Humanity, Omega Massif, Shai Hulud, Sydney Ducks, This Is Hell, Wisdom in Chains and Withdrawal.

References

External links
Official website

Heavy metal festivals in Belgium
Music festivals established in 1992
Music organisations based in Belgium
Punk rock festivals
Rock festivals in Belgium
Summer events in Belgium